Rupert John Hopkins (5 April 1900 – 6 April 1973) was an Australian rules footballer who played with Footscray in the Victorian Football League (VFL).

Notes

External links 

1900 births
1973 deaths
Australian rules footballers from Victoria (Australia)
Western Bulldogs players